The Senate of Pakistan has a number of committees each of which handles a specific legislative area. The committee members usually have specialized knowledge or interest in the matters under their jurisdiction. The committees monitor government activities, identify issues suitable for legislative review, gather and evaluate information, and recommend courses of action to the Senate. The number of committees has gradually increased from six during Zulfikar Ali Bhutto's government (1973–77) to fifty-two, as of 2017. There are several types of committee, with the majority (thirty-four) called the "standing committees" and others called "functional committee".

References

External links

Senate of Pakistan
Parliamentary committees
Pakistan politics-related lists